Enchanter may refer to:

Magic and paranormal 
Enchanter (paranormal), a practitioner of magic which has the ability to attain objectives using supernatural or nonrational means
Enchanter (fantasy), someone who uses or practices magic that derives from supernatural or occult sources
Seduction, the enticement of one person by another, called a seducer or enchanter when it is a handsome and charismatic man

Entertainment 
Enchanter (manga), a 2002 manga series by Izumi Kawachi
Enchanter (novel), a 1996 novel by Sara Douglass
The Enchanter, a 1939 novella by Vladimir Nabokov

Games 
Enchanter (video game), a 1983 interactive fiction game by Infocom

Other 
The Enchanter, a nickname for Martin Van Buren, the eighth president of United States

See also 

 Enchant (disambiguation)
 Enchanted (disambiguation)
 Enchantment (disambiguation)
Enchanters (disambiguation), various meanings including a number of similarly named American vocal groups in the Doo Wop and R&B genres that recorded in the 1950s and 1960s
Enchantress (disambiguation)
Tim the Enchanter, a character from the 1975 movie Monty Python and the Holy Grail